A bell-boy hat or bellboy cap is a small round or oval brimless cap with a crown about 2–3 inches in height, resembling a squat can or drum. It is often worn as part of the uniform of a bellhop. The bell-boy hat is based on a 19th-century military drummer boy's cap. A bell-boy hat usually features a chinstrap, and is trimmed to match the rest of a bellhop's uniform.

As a fashion item, the style was popular in the late 1930s and 1940s for women, when it could be dressed up with veils, military trimmings or a snood (a decorative hairnet).  The chinstrap would then be worn to the back – under the skull – to help secure it to the head. A bellhop's hat is also frequently seen in the logo of the Belgian comic character Spirou, as the character is depicted as being a bellboy.

See also
Pillbox hat

Headgear
Hats